Horses in the Sky is the fourth album by the Canadian post-rock band Silver Mt. Zion, this time under the alias Thee Silver Mt. Zion Memorial Orchestra & Tra-La-La Band. This is the first Silver Mt. Zion release to feature lyrics on every track (an aspect of the band distinguishing it from parent group Godspeed You! Black Emperor).

Overview
On its record label page, the band describes the album as "6 busted 'waltzes' for world wars 4 thru 6" (sic), noting that "first song's about war and drug addiction, fourth song's about kanada, and the rest of it is all love songs" (sic). Track 5, the song "Hang on to Each Other" was recorded "next to a campfire by the river", "at Garfield's fire pit".

The album was released on vinyl on March 7, 2005 in Europe and March 21, 2005 in North America, and on CD on March 21, 2005 in Europe and April 4, 2005 in North America. On the fourth side of the double vinyl set, there are designs etched onto the surface of the record (credited to Nadia Moss in the liner notes).

Track listing
All music and lyrics by Silver Mt. Zion.

Personnel
Thee Silver Mt. Zion Memorial Orchestra & Tra-La-La Band
Thierry Amar – contrabass, glasses, harmonica, voice, mixing
Beckie Foon – cello, voice, mixing
Ian Ilavsky – guitar, harmonium, voice, mixing
Scott Levine Gilmore – drums, percussion, guitar, mandolin, voice, mixing
Efrim Menuck – guitar, piano, voice, mixing
Jessica Moss – violin, piano, glasses, voice, mixing
Sophie Trudeau – violin, trumpet, glasses, voice, mixing

Technical
Howard Bilerman – mixing and recording
J. F. Chicoine – mastering

Graphical
Luc Paradis – drawings (dead marine, horse, bird)
Nadia Moss – side 4 etching
Silver Mt. Zion – other collages and scribblings

References
 Horses in the Sky at Constellation Records
 Horses in the Sky CD liner notes, CST033-2

External links
Lyrics at the official website
 "God Bless Our Dead Marines" p. 1 & 2
 "Mountains Made of Steam" p. 1 & 2
 "Horses in the Sky"
 "Teddy Roosevelt's Guns"
 "Hang on to Each Other" p. 1 & 2 & 3
 "Ring Them Bells (Freedom Has Come and Gone)" p. 1 & 2

2005 albums
Thee Silver Mt. Zion albums
Constellation Records (Canada) albums
Albums produced by Howard Bilerman